Katrina Susan Molloy (born 22 January 1962) is a New Zealand former cricketer who played as a right-arm medium bowler. She appeared in 2 Test matches and 5 One Day Internationals for New Zealand in 1985. She played domestic cricket for Auckland and North Shore.

References

External links

1962 births
Living people
Cricketers from Hamilton, New Zealand
New Zealand women cricketers
New Zealand women Test cricketers
New Zealand women One Day International cricketers
Auckland Hearts cricketers
North Shore women cricketers